The Bank of America Building, also known as 10 Light Street and formerly as the Baltimore Trust Company Building, is a 34-story,  skyscraper located at the corner of East Baltimore and Light Streets in downtown Baltimore, Maryland.

Description
10 Light Street was the tallest building in the state, and the tallest office building in the United States south of New York City when constructed in 1929. The Art Deco building was designed by the firm of Taylor and Fisher, and completed in eighteen months, fashioned from Indiana sandstone and local brick over a steel frame at a cost of (U.S.) $3 million.

The building's exterior is decorated with carved Romanesque human and animal images, stylized eagles, and is capped with a copper and gold roof. The ornate, two-story main banking lobby is highly decorated with mosaic floors designed by Hildreth Meiere, and historic murals by Griffith Baily Coale and McGill Mackall on historic themes:  the Baltimore fire of 1904, and the writing of the National Anthem at the Battle of Baltimore during the War of 1812. These mosaics are planned to be covered by artificial turf, so that the historic lobby can be used as an Under Armour gym.

History
Shortly after the Baltimore Trust Company moved into the building in 1929, the Great Depression began and the company floundered. The building was essentially vacant within a year, as the bank went into bankruptcy in 1933 and receivership in 1935. The empty building was subsequently used by the New Deal's Public Works Administration in Maryland.

From the 1940s into the 1960s, the building was first known as the Mathieson Building and then the O'Sullivan Building, reflecting its then-current major tenants.  In 1947, the building housed the transmitter and antenna of WMAR-TV, the first TV station in Maryland and 14th overall in the country and the 3rd CBS affiliate. At that time, just down the Street was Sun Place, the headquarters of the Baltimore Sun who founded the TV station. That top floor is now a private lounge for tenants of the building, but the TV tower atop the building is still there unused to this day.

During those years, Semmes, Bowen and Semmes, a major Maryland law firm with origins in the 19th century, occupied the twenty-first floor, and later as many as four whole floors (when the firm employed almost 150 attorneys), remaining in 10 Light Street until approximately 1990, at what was called the "Baltimore Trust Building", according to the 1952 memoir of Whittaker Chambers, whose Semmes attorneys were Richard F. Cleveland (youngest son of President Grover Cleveland) and William D. Macmillan.

In 1961, the building was purchased by Maryland National Bank, successor of Baltimore Trust, and the building name was changed to "Maryland National Bank Building". Maryland National was itself purchased by NationsBank in 1993, and the name of the building was changed again, to "NationsBank Building". The structure then obtained its current name following the NationsBank merger with BankAmerica in 1997. Major portions of the building were restored, including the copper-clad dome, which is once again floodlit at night.

In December 2012, the building was acquired by a Virginia firm, Metropolitan Partnership Ltd., which plans to convert all floors above the fourth into 445 residential apartments. The lower floors of the building remained available for retail tenants. Bank of America announced that it would close the ground floor banking center in May 2013. Miles & Stockbridge, a prominent Baltimore law firm, had maintained offices in the building since 1932 when one of the firm's founders, Clarence Miles, moved into the building. Now a portion of the ground floor is occupied by the FX Studios & Under Armour Performance Center while the majority of its remainder is employed as apartments or office space, the building now also features a penthouse.

See also
List of tallest buildings in Baltimore

References

External links

Downtown Baltimore
Residential skyscrapers in Baltimore
Art Deco architecture in Maryland
Office buildings completed in 1929
Bank of America buildings